Queen Mimi is a 2015 documentary film about the life of Marie Haist, an octogenarian homeless woman who lived in a Santa Monica laundromat for 18 years, directed by Yaniv Rokah and produced by Elliot V Kotek.

Release
The film was selected for the Sarasota Film Festival. In May 2016 XLRator Media released the film worldwide.

Cast 

Mimi as herself
Zach Galifianakis as himself
Stan Fox as himself

Awards and nominations

Soundtrack

Queen Mimi is a 2016 soundtrack album from the documentary containing a song by Grammy Award nominee Deana Carter titled "Celebrate Life", written by Ralph Stevens and Deana Carter.

References

2015 films
Documentary films about women
Documentary films about homelessness in the United States
Santa Monica, California
2010s English-language films